Hugh Swynnerton Thomas, Baron Thomas of Swynnerton (21 October 1931 – 7 May 2017) was an English historian and writer, best known for his book The Spanish Civil War.

Early life
Thomas was born on 21 October 1931 in Windsor, England, to Hugh Whitelegge Thomas, a colonial commissioner, and his wife Margery Augusta Angelo, née Swynnerton. Sir Shenton Thomas was his uncle. He was educated at Sherborne School in Dorset, before going up to Queens' College, Cambridge, where he was a major scholar and later an Honorary Fellow. Thomas gained a first class in Part I of the History Tripos in 1952, and the following year was president of the Cambridge Union Society. He also studied at the Sorbonne in Paris.

Career
From 1954 to 1957, Thomas worked in the Foreign Office partly as secretary of the British Delegation to the sub-committee of the UN Disarmament Commission. From 1966 to 1975, he was Professor of History at the University of Reading, and chairman of the European committee. He was then chairman of the neoliberal Centre for Policy Studies in London from 1979 to 1991.

Politics
Until 1974, Thomas was a member of the Labour Party. He was created a life peer as Baron Thomas of Swynnerton, of Notting Hill in Greater London by letters patent dated 16 June 1981, and sat as a Conservative, before he joined the Liberal Democrats in late 1997. He later sat as a crossbencher.

He wrote political works favouring European integration, such as Europe: the Radical Challenge (1973), as well as histories. He was also the author of three novels: The World's Game (1957), The Oxygen Age (1958), and Klara (1988). Thomas's 1961 book The Spanish Civil War won the Somerset Maugham Award for 1962. A significantly revised and enlarged third edition was published in 1977; further editions were published in 1999 and 2012. Cuba, or the Pursuit of Freedom (1971) is a book of over 1,500 pages tracing the history of Cuba from Spanish colonial rule until the Cuban Revolution. In 1985, he signed a petition against the Sandinista National Liberation Front of Nicaragua, in support of the Contras, an anti-Sandinista paramilitary group.

In 1990 he was one of the leading historians behind the setting up of the History Curriculum Association. The Association advocated a more knowledge-based history curriculum in schools. It expressed "profound disquiet" at the way history was being taught in the classroom and observed that the integrity of history was threatened.

Personal life
Thomas was married to Hon. Vanessa Jebb, a painter and daughter of Gladwyn Jebb, the first Acting United Nations Secretary-General and British Ambassador to France. They had three children: Inigo, Isambard and Isabella.

Awards 
Thomas won the Somerset Maugham Award (1962), the Nonino Prize (2009), the Boccaccio Prize (2009), the Gabarrón Prize (2008) and the Calvo Serer Prize (2009). The French Government appointed him Commander of the Order of Arts and Letters in 2008.

Thomas also received the Grand Cross of the Royal Order of Isabella the Catholic from Spain, as well as the Mexican Order of the Aztec Eagle, the Joaquín Romero Murube Prize in Seville (2013) and the Grand Cross of the Civil Order of Alfonso X the Wise (2014).

Works 
 Disarmament – the way ahead Fabian Society (1957).
 The Spanish Civil War (1961); Penguin Books Ltd (1968); 2nd revised edition (1977); 4th revised edition (2003). A new revised edition in 2011 commemorated the book's reaching 50 consecutive years in print; it was published in 15 languages. online
 Cuba or the Pursuit of Freedom (1971); revised editions (1998), (2002), (2010). online
 Europe: the Radical Challenge (1973).
 John Strachey (1973). online
 An Unfinished History of the World (1979); published in the United States as A History of the World, then as World History (1998); and under the original title in London (by Hamish Hamilton) in 1979, and with revised editions in 1981 and 1982. online edition
 The revolution on balance (1983), Washington, DC; Cuban American National Foundation 1983 (CANF pamphlet #5). online
 Armed Truce (1986). A history of the beginning of the Cold War. online
 Ever Closer Union (1991).
 The conquest of Mexico (1993); published in the United States as Conquest: Montezuma, Cortés and the Fall of Old Mexico. online
 The Slave Trade: The History of the Atlantic Slave Trade 1440–1870 (1997); Simon & Schuster. online
 Who Is Who of the Conquistadors (2000). A study of those who fought for Cortés.
 Rivers of Gold (2003); the first book in a trilogy about the Spanish Empire. online
 Beaumarchais in Seville (2006); .
 Eduardo Barreiros and the Recovery of Spain (2009); a biography of Eduardo Barreiros.
 The Golden Age: The Spanish Empire of Charles V (2010); the second book in a trilogy about the Spanish Empire. Published in the United States as The Golden Empire: Spain, Charles V, and the Creation of America (2011).
 The World's Game; a novel (1957).
 The Oxygen Age; a novel (1958).
 Klara, a novel (1988).
 The Suez Affair (1966); an analysis of the Suez Crisis of 1956.
 World Without End: The Global Empire of Philip II (2014); the third volume in a trilogy about the Spanish Empire.

Arms

References

Further reading
 Restall, Matthew. "World Without End: Spain, Philip II, and the First Global Empire.' Journal of World History  (2016) 27#3 pp. 571–576. Reviews the book and his career.

External links

1931 births
2017 deaths
People from Windsor, Berkshire
People educated at Sherborne School
British historians
British Hispanists
University of Paris alumni
Crossbench life peers
Presidents of the Cambridge Union
Alumni of Queens' College, Cambridge
Fellows of the Royal Society of Literature
Commandeurs of the Ordre des Arts et des Lettres
Knights Grand Cross of the Order of Isabella the Catholic
Historians of Spain
Recipients of the Civil Order of Alfonso X, the Wise
Liberal Democrats (UK) life peers
Conservative Party (UK) life peers
Historians of the Spanish Civil War
Life peers created by Elizabeth II